Hostage Calm/Anti-Flag is a split EP between American punk rock bands Hostage Calm and Anti-Flag. The EP was released on February 26, 2013 through Run For Cover Records and A-F Records. This release marked the last appearance by drummer John Ross who left the band in April 2013.

Track listing

Personnel
Hostage Calm
Tom Chiari - Lead Guitar
Tim Casey - Bass, Vocals
Chris Martin - Lead Vocals, Guitars, Piano
Nick Balzano - Guitar, Backing Vocals
John Ross - Drums

Anti-Flag
Justin Sane – Guitar, Vocals
Chris #2 – Bass, Vocals
Chris Head – Guitar, Vocals
Pat Thetic – Drums

Additional Personnel
Chris Teti - Engineer, Mixing (track 1)
Greg Thomas - Engineer, Mixing (track 1)
Mass Giorgini - Mastering (track 2)
Justin Francis - Mixing (track 2)
Dan Coutant - Mastering (track 1)
Adam Vass - Artwork

References

2013 EPs
Split EPs
Run for Cover Records EPs